Krisztina Regőczy (born 19 April 1955) is a former ice dancer from Hungary. Competing with András Sallay, she won the gold medal at the 1980 World Figure Skating Championships and the silver at that year's Winter Olympics. Regőczy coached in the United States for a number of years before returning to Budapest. She is the figure skating sports director for the International Skating Union.

Results
(ice dance with András Sallay)

References

 
 Regőczy Krisztina nem felejti Lake Placid-et, Népszava, 2007.

Navigation

1955 births
Living people
Hungarian female ice dancers
Figure skaters at the 1976 Winter Olympics
Figure skaters at the 1980 Winter Olympics
Olympic figure skaters of Hungary
Olympic silver medalists for Hungary
Olympic medalists in figure skating
World Figure Skating Championships medalists
European Figure Skating Championships medalists
Medalists at the 1980 Winter Olympics